Agonopterix putridella is a moth of the family Depressariidae. It is found in Great Britain, France, Germany, Switzerland, Austria, the Czech Republic, Hungary, Romania, Ukraine and Russia.

The wingspan is 15–18 mm. Adults are on wing from July to August.

The larvae feed on Peucedanum species, including Peucedanum officinale, Peucedanum cervaria and Peucedanum alsaticum. They feed in an untidy gathering or spinning of leaves of the host plant. Larvae can be found from May to June.

References

External links
lepiforum.de

Moths described in 1775
Agonopterix
Moths of Europe